Lactuca hirsuta, the hairy lettuce, is a North American species of wild lettuce. It is widespread across much of central Canada and the eastern and central United States from Ontario, Québec, Prince Edward Island, and Nova Scotia south as far as Texas, Louisiana, and Florida.

The top of the stem bears a multibranched inflorescence with many flower heads. Each head contains 12–24 blue ray florets but no disc florets. The fruit is a brown achene.

References

External links
Photo of herbarium specimen at Missouri Botanical Garden, collected in Missouri in 1992

hirsuta
Flora of North America
Plants described in 1818
Taxa named by Gotthilf Heinrich Ernst Muhlenberg